Ponnur is a town in Guntur district of the Indian state of Andhra Pradesh. There was a festival on full moon day in May. A road to Chandole goes south-east and comes to Nidubrolu, where there is a temple with a stone bearing inscription recording the erection of 90 temple in A.D. 1132. An ancient Telugu manuscript entitled 'Ponnuru-Chandavolu Shasanam' was present in Potti Sreeramulu Telugu University. Kilari Venkata Rosaiah of YSRCP party is the current MLA of the constituency, who won the 2019 Andhra Pradesh Legislative Assembly election. It is a municipality and the mandal headquarter of Ponnur mandal under Tenali revenue division.

Demographics 

The total population constitute,  males and  —a sex ratio of 1032 females per 1000 males, higher than the national average of 940 per 1000.  children are in the age group of 0–6 years. The average literacy rate stands at 78.33% with  literates, higher than the national average of 73.00%.

Government and politics

Civic Administration 

Ponnur Municipality oversees the civic needs of the town like, water supply, roads, sewage, garbage collection etc. It is classified as a Grade–II municipality which was established in 1964 as a III–Grade municipality. The town gets water from the Krishna river, which is supplied through taps, bores etc. The town has both government and private hospitals which include, clinics, nursing homes and a Government hospital for public healthcare. It also maintains parks and playgrounds for recreational purpose

Politics 

Ponnur being a part of Ponnur mandal, falls under Ponnur assembly constituency of Andhra Pradesh Legislative Assembly. Venkata Rosaiah Kilari is the present MLA of the constituency from YSRCP. The assembly segment is in turn a part of Guntur lok sabha constituency and the present Member of parliament is Galla Jayadev of Telugu Desam Party.

Economy 

Ponnur is an important town for the nearby villages. The rural areas surrounding the town are mostly dependent on agriculture. The farming is dominant with paddy cultivation and others crops include ground nuts, cotton, betel etc. There exists several other economic industries and occupations in the town such as, brickworks, furniture making, handloom weaving, spinning khadi yarn, rice mills, timber etc. The town is also a part of Tenali–Ponnur growth corridor.

Culture 

Legend about Ponnuru | Once there lived two brahmans namely Kasibhatlu who was childless and his sister's son  Nanduri Gunugovindu  with deformed haunchback. They went on pilgrimage to Benares where Kasibhatlu moved with compassion,  promised Govindu  if ever daughter should be born to him, she would be given to him in marriage. Instantly Govindu called upon Bhava Narayana Swamy, a sacred river and certain trees growing  on the banks as witnesses. Brahmans returned to Ponnuru. A daughter was born to Kasibhatlu. When She grew up, Govindu  claimed the fulfillment of promise by Kasibhatlu . Kasibhatlu was reluctant to keep his word.  Witnesses were called upon by Govindu. One night, when  Kasibhatlu slept, Bhava Narayana Swamy appeared to remember promise. In morning when awoke,  Kasibhatlu saw Ganges and trees at door, because of overflown river. Warned by witnesses Kasibhatlu gave his daughter to Govindu in marriage. There are a few notable people from the town with their contributions to various fields such as, N. G. Ranga, Pragada Kotaiah. The town has an auditorium and a function hall for cultural events of the town.

There are many religious worship centers in the town like, temples, mosques and churches. Most notable religious structures are, the temples of Sakshi Bhavanarayana and Sahastra Lingeswara, a single stone carved statues of  Anjaneya and  Garuthmantha.

Transport 

State Highway 48, also known as Guntur-Bapatla-Chirala Road passes through Ponnur, which connects it with the district headquarter, Guntur. The Ponnur–Repalle Road connects National Highway 216 at Chandole. The state government operates APSRTC bus services to the nearby towns and villages.

Education
Zilla parishad high school is the prominent one, run by Panchayat Raj department under the government of Andhra Pradesh. PBN is famous college for intermediate and degree courses. The primary and secondary school education is imparted by government, aided and private schools, under the School Education Department of the state. The medium of instruction followed by different schools are English and Telugu.

The town has both government and private educational institutions with a total of 34 primary, 3 upper primary and 12 high schools. There are also two government run junior colleges.

See also
Ramesh Ponnuru

References 

Towns in Guntur district
Mandal headquarters in Guntur district
Towns in Andhra Pradesh Capital Region